Grand Funk Lives is the 12th studio album by Grand Funk Railroad. The album was released in 1981 by Full Moon Records. It was their first album since disbanding in 1976. Although known as a reunion album, it did not feature bassist Mel Schacher or keyboard player Craig Frost.  The album was the first to feature bassist Dennis Bellinger and the first and only to feature keyboardist Lance Duncan Ong.

The track "Queen Bee" was featured in the 1981 motion picture soundtrack for the animated film Heavy Metal.

Track listing
All songs written and composed by Mark Farner, except where noted.

Personnel
 Mark Farner – guitar, piano, vocals
 Lance Duncan Ong – keyboards, synthesizer
 Dennis Bellinger – bass, vocals
 Don Brewer – drums, vocals

Charts
Album

Singles

References

1982 albums
Grand Funk Railroad albums
Albums produced by Thom Panunzio
Full Moon Records albums